Richard Stringer (born 15 March 1772) was an English cricketer who played in a single first-class cricket match.

Stringer was born at Leicester in 1772 and is known to have played cricket for Leicester and Leicestershire sides between 1789 and 1800. He made his only first-class appearance for a combined Nottinghamshire and Leicestershire side in 1803.

References

External links

1772 births
English cricketers
English cricketers of 1787 to 1825
Leicestershire cricketers
Cricketers from Leicester
Year of death unknown